Bharat Sawad (born 1968, date of death unknown) was a Nepalese weightlifter. He competed in the men's flyweight event at the 1988 Summer Olympics.

References

External links
 

1968 births
Year of death missing
Nepalese male weightlifters
Olympic weightlifters of Nepal
Weightlifters at the 1988 Summer Olympics
Place of birth missing